Senator Schaffer may refer to:

Bob Schaffer (born 1962), Colorado State Senate
Jack Schaffer (born 1942), Illinois State Senate
Tim Schaffer (born 1963), Ohio State Senate

See also
Senator Schaefer (disambiguation)
Senator Shafer (disambiguation)
Senator Shaffer (disambiguation)